A rubber-tyred tram (also known as tramway on tyres) is a development of the guided bus in which a vehicle is guided by a fixed rail in the road surface and draws current from overhead electric wires (either via pantograph or trolley poles).

Two incompatible systems using physical guide rails exist, the Guided Light Transit (GLT) designed by Bombardier Transportation, and the Translohr from Lohr Industrie (currently made by Alstom and FSI). There are no guide bars at the sides but there is a central guidance rail that differs in design between the systems. In the case of Translohr, this rail is grasped by a pair of metal guide wheels set at 45° to the road and at 90° to each other. In the GLT system, a single double-flanged wheel between the rubber tires follows the guidance rail. In both cases, the weight of the vehicle is borne by rubber tires to which the guide wheels are attached, which make contact with the road on concrete roll ways designed to minimize impact on the ground. Power is usually supplied by overhead lines, rechargeable batteries, or internal combustion engines where there are no overhead wires.

Characteristics 
The Translohr system operates as a guided vehicle at all times, while with the Bombardier system the vehicles can be driven independently as requirements dictate, such as journeys to the depot. Consequently, the Bombardier vehicles are legally considered buses, and must bear rear-view mirrors, lights and number plates, and are controlled with steering wheels and pedals like ordinary buses, though the steering wheel is not used when following the guidance rail. On the other hand, Translohr vehicles operate like standard trams and cannot move without guidance, so they are not classified as buses and are not equipped with number plates.  The ART system can be diverted by virtual track by the driver using a conventional steering wheel. 

These systems are intended to offer a more tram or light rail-like experience than a regular guided bus, and offer some advantages over steel-wheeled trams, such as the ability to climb steeper gradients (up to 13%), and quieter running around corners. The infrastructure installation can be less complicated than the installation of a complete tram line in an existing street. These systems have been likened to the tram equivalent of rubber-tyred metros, and they are also less efficient than steel-wheeled light rail vehicles. There is no evidence to prove the superiority of either guidance system. Both Bombardier and Translohr have had derailments during operation.

Systems in operation

Translohr

 Clermont-Ferrand tramway, France (STE4, since 2006)
 Padua tramway, Italy (STE3, since 2007)
 TEDA Modern Guided Rail Tram, Tianjin, China (STE3, since 2007)
 Mestre-Venice tramway, Italy (STE3, since 2010)
 Zhangjiang Tram, Shanghai, China (STE3, since 2010)
 Île-de-France tramway Line 5, France (STE3, since 2013)
 Île-de-France tramway Line 6, France (STE6, since 2014)
 Ayacucho Tram, Medellin, Colombia (STE5, since 2015)

Retired systems

Bombardier Guided Light Transit (GLT)

 Nancy Guided Light Transit, France (2001—2023) 40% of the line runs as a driver steered trolley bus.  The entire route is to be converted after 2020 to light rail by 2023 (though the project has recently been converted to a trolleybus-only system because of the cost).
 Caen Guided Light Transit, France (2002—2017) GLT closed in 2017 and converted to light rail which opened in 2019.

Proposed systems

Translohr
 Ljubljana tram, Slovenia (proposed)
 Antananarivo, Madagascar (proposed)

Other
 Cambridge, United Kingdom.  One of the three systems under consideration for the proposed  Cambridge Autonomous Metro utilises a "fully autonomous, battery-powered road transport vehicle".  (The other options are a personal rapid transit and a guided bus.  An upgrade bus service is also being considered.)

See also 

 Autonomous Rail Rapid Transit
 Budd–Michelin rubber-tired rail cars
 Flat tire
 Outline of tires
 Rubber-tyred metro
 Tram

References